Cove Tourist Court is a historic former tourist accommodation at 771 Park Avenue in Hot Springs, Arkansas.  It is a U-shaped facility, a single story in height, built with wood framing and a stucco exterior in the International Style of architecture.  Each of the nine units has an entrance sheltered by a shed roof with Craftsman brackets, and a single-car garage with a two-leaf hinged door.  Built about 1937, it is a well-preserved example of the tourist court form in International Style.  It has since been converted into residential apartments.

The property was listed on the National Register of Historic Places in 2004.

See also
National Register of Historic Places listings in Garland County, Arkansas

References

Hotel buildings on the National Register of Historic Places in Arkansas
International style architecture in Arkansas
Buildings and structures completed in 1937
Buildings and structures in Hot Springs, Arkansas
National Register of Historic Places in Hot Springs, Arkansas